Evgeny Elgin also spelled as Evgeni Elgin (born 10 March 1987) is a Russian rugby union player who generally plays as a lock represents Russia internationally.

He was included in the Russian squad for the 2019 Rugby World Cup which was held in Japan for the first time and also marked his first World Cup appearance.

Career 
He made his international debut for Russia against Germany on 13 February 2016.

Honours
 Russian Championships (7): 2014, 2016, 2017, 2018, 2019, 2020-21, 2021-22
 Russian Cup (6): 2014, 2016, 2017, 2020, 2021, 2022
 Russian Supercup (3): 2014, 2015, 2017
 European Rugby Continental Shield: 2017-18

References 

Russian rugby union players
Russia international rugby union players
Living people
1987 births
Sportspeople from Krasnoyarsk
Rugby union locks
Yenisey-STM Krasnoyarsk players